Richard Miskolci is a Brazilian sociologist. He is Full Professor of Sociology  at UNIFESP (Federal University of São Paulo) (Federal University of São Paulo), Brazil, and also a researcher of CNPq (National Council for Scientific and Technological Development).  Miskolci is the leader of the Research Center Quereres. 

He initiated his career dealing with Critical Theory, but the contact with the works of Michel Foucault and Cultural Studies attracted his attention to the field of differences. Miskolci has researched in Germany and was a Student-at-large in the humanities at the University of Chicago before receiving his PhD in Sociology from University of São Paulo (2001). He got tenured as a professor of sociology at UFSCar Federal University of São Carlos where he worked between 2004 and 2018.

Miskolci has contributed to disseminate Queer Theory in the Brazilian academic field in a dialogue with its own tradition of sexuality studies, especially those created under the influence of Néstor Perlongher's work. Miskolci has edited (with Júlio Assis Simões) the first Brazilian compilation of Queer Studies. "Dissent Sexualities" (2007) received the Award Citizenship in Respect to Diversity (2008).

Brazilian sexuality studies and activism is marked by identitarian tendencies while Miskolci's work supports a non-identitary perspective based on queer and gender theories. Gender defies identity as a concept that underlines the importance of social structures (both cultural and historical ones) defining our desires and self-comprehension. Miskolci's work stands in opposition to crude identity politics as well to studies based on the illusion of a stable subject/identity.

Miskolci has worked in a senior research with David M. Halperin to develop the methodology for his historical research on nation and desire in the Brazilian fin de siècle. The research was conducted during over 10 years with different grants until it became a book:  (2012). In this work, he analyses the Brazilian elite project of creating a nation with European immigrants and also disciplining the local population.  The ideals of whiteness and masculinity of the ruling elite directed this authoritarian project during the first decades of the Brazilian Republic (proclaimed in 1889).

Between 2014 and 2018 he worked in the coordination of Sociology at CAPES, the Brazilian agency that manages the graduate system. He is also a member of the Research Committee Futures Research of the International Sociological Association (ISA) and of the TG Digital Sociology of the Brazilian Sociological Society (SBS). 

Miskolci has researched the contemporary use of digital media in Brazilian society since 2007. This research, sponsored by CNPq and FAPESP, became his main area of interest. In 2016 he has organized the first Brazilian compilation on Digital Sociology and also founded the Thematic Group Digital Sociology at the Brazilian Sociological Association. In 2017, he published , a book that summarizes his researchers about how homosexual men use digital media to search for sexual partners. 

One of his last researches was on how online social networks helped to frame in moral terms the Brazilian public sphere. In 2021, Miskolci has published , a book in which he analyzes how both identity politics and right-wing adversaries work under the same framework that has led to social polarization, authoritarianism and censorship impoverishing and corroding the conditions for democratic debate.

Miskolci takes part in an international research on political polarization in Latin America and also has an individual research project that deals with the relation between ICTs, misinformation and collective health. Miskolci received a CAPES senior researcher fellowship to work at the Universidad Complutense de Madrid comparing the Brazilian and the Spaniard cases during the COVID-19 pandemic.

Publication list
 Miskolci, Richard. . São Paulo: Annablume/FAPESP, 2003.
 _. (editor) . São Carlos: PPGCS, 2005.
 Miskolci, Richard. . São Paulo: Annablume/FAPESP, 2012.
 _. Scavone, Lucila; Alvarez, M. C. (editors) . São Paulo: Editora Unesp/FAPESP, 2006.
 _. Simões, Júlio Assis. (editors) "" In: Cadernos Pagu Campinas: Pagu-UNICAMP, 2007.
 Miskolci, Richard. (editor) "". São Carlos: EdUFSCar, 2010.
 Miskolci, Richard & Pelúcio, Larissa. . São Paulo: FAPESP/Annablume, 2012.
 Miskolci, Richard. . Belo Horizonte: Autêntica, 2012.
 Miskolci, Richard & Leite Júnior, Jorge. . São Carlos: Edufscar, 2014.
 
 
 Miskolci, Richard. . Belo Horizonte: Autêntica, 2017.
 
 
 Miskolci, Richard. . Belo Horizonte: Autêntica, 2021.

References

External links 
 Richard Miskolci's Profile at the Graduate Program in Collective Health (UNIFESP)
 Miskolci's Page on Academia.edu
 
 Richard Miskolci's Profile at UNIFESP General Directory Somos UNIFESP

Queer theorists
Brazilian social scientists
Brazilian sociologists
Date of birth missing (living people)
University of Chicago alumni
University of Michigan alumni
University of California alumni
University of São Paulo alumni
Living people
Year of birth missing (living people)
Academic staff of the Federal University of São Paulo